is the main railway terminal of the city of Kumamoto, Japan. It is located in Nishi-ku, Kumamoto, and is operated by Kyushu Railway Company (JR Kyushu).

In front of the station is a tram stop of the tram operated by Kumamoto City Transportation Bureau named Kumamoto-Ekimae Station.

Lines 
Kumamoto is an intermediate station of the Kyushu Shinkansen and the Kagoshima Main Line and a terminal station of the Hōhi Main Line.

JR limited express trains
 Trans-Kyushu Limited Express (Beppu - Hitoyoshi)
 Kumagawa (Kumamoto - Hitoyoshi)

Platforms

Adjacent stations 

Railway stations in Kumamoto Prefecture
Buildings and structures in Kumamoto
Railway stations in Japan opened in 1891